Glacial River Warren, also known as River Warren, was a prehistoric river that drained Lake Agassiz in central North America between about 13,500 and 10,650 BP calibrated (11,700 and 9,400 14C uncalibrated) years ago. A part of the uppermost portion of the former river channel was designated a National Natural Landmark in 1966.

Geological history

Lake Agassiz was formed from the meltwaters of the Laurentide Ice Sheet during the Wisconsin glaciation of the last ice age. Blocked by an ice sheet to the north, the lake water rose until about 13,500 BP calibrated (11,700 14C uncalibrated) years ago when it overtopped the Big Stone Moraine, a ridge of glacial drift left by the receding glacier, at the location of Browns Valley, Minnesota. The channel through the moraine, between Lake Traverse and Big Stone Lake, is now crossed by the divide between the watersheds of the Gulf of Mexico and Hudson Bay. Its significance was recognized by designation as a National Natural Landmark under the Historic Sites Act.

From Traverse Gap issued Glacial River Warren.  From its inception until final abandonment of Agassiz' southern outlet, this stream drained the meltwater of that lake to the Mississippi valley. The drainage was not continuous, as Lake Agassiz periodically had other outlets. The Laurentide Ice Sheet retreated and advanced with climatic variations and these changes in ice cover contributed to isostatic adjustments in the level of the land over which the watercourses ran.  These changes in turn uncovered or blocked the lake's other outlets to the sea.

Course
River Warren was joined by the comparatively small Mississippi at Fort Snelling, from which the valley continues northeast to present-day Saint Paul, where the massive River Warren Falls once graced the landscape. Over 1700 years this waterfall retreated upstream and undercut the Mississippi at the site of Fort Snelling. The falls then split. The Mississippi falls migrated upstream to form Saint Anthony Falls and create Minnehaha Falls in Minneapolis.

From Saint Paul the great valley goes southeast to Prescott, Wisconsin, where it is joined by the St. Croix River, itself once the outlet of another proglacial lake, Glacial Lake Duluth which occupied the western part of Lake Superior.  From its confluence with the St. Croix the valley continues southeast along the Minnesota–Wisconsin border.  River Warren's effects include the creation of bluffs along the valleys of the Minnesota and Mississippi Rivers, and contributed to the formation of Lake Pepin.

Disappearance
By about 9400 BP, the ice sheet finally retreated sufficiently far to the north that Lake Agassiz permanently took another outlet and receded below the level of Traverse Gap. River Warren then ceased to run. The Lake Agassiz area watershed now feeds the Red River of the North which flows north, ultimately to Hudson Bay. River Warren's upper valley in the Traverse Gap is now occupied by the tiny Little Minnesota River, which flows into Big Stone Lake and the Minnesota River, which follows the greater river's ancient bed to its confluence with the Mississippi River.  These streams occupy only a small cross-section of River Warren's  riverbed.

Name
The hydrology of the oversized valley was first explained by General G. K. Warren in 1868. He made a detailed survey of the valley in his search for possible transcontinental railroad routes. In appreciation of this work, the glacial river that was the outlet of Lake Agassiz was named River Warren.

See also
Geology of Minnesota
Glacial history of Minnesota
Laurentide Ice Sheet
Proglacial lakes of Minnesota

References

Notes

Sources

Books, journals and monographs
  (archived from original)
 

 
 
 
 
 Wright, W. E. (1990). Geologic History of Minnesota Rivers.  Minnesota Geological Survey, Educational Series 7. St. Paul:  University of Minnesota.  ISSN 0544-3083.

Websites 
  Aerial photographs of River Warren channel between the Twin Cities and Le Sueur, Minnesota, with diagrams and discussion of the glacial river.

Geology of South Dakota
Geology of Minnesota
Former rivers
Mississippi River
8th millennium BC
National Natural Landmarks in Minnesota
Megafloods
Urstromtal
National Natural Landmarks in South Dakota